Blaine Forsythe is a Canadian ice hockey coach. He is currently an assistant coach with the Washington Capitals of the National Hockey League (NHL).

Forsythe joined the Washington Capitals organization as a video coach prior to the start of the 2006–07 NHL season. On June 24, 2013, Forsythe was promoted to serve as an assistant coach under Adam Oates.
He currently serves under Peter Laviolette.

References

https://www.nhl.com/capitals/team/coaching-staff

External links

Blaine Forsythe's profile at Eliteprospects.com

1986 births
Living people
Canadian ice hockey coaches
Stanley Cup champions